The 2017 Independence Cup was a cricket tournament that took place in Lahore, Pakistan. It was contested between a World XI team and Pakistan across three Twenty20 International (T20I) matches. Pakistan won the series 2–1.

South Africa's Faf du Plessis captained the World XI team, with Sarfaraz Ahmed leading Pakistan. Ten of the players in the Pakistan squad had not previously played in an international match at home. The World XI side arrived in Lahore a day before the first fixture under high security. The cup was named in commemoration of Pakistan's 70th year of independence.

The International Cricket Council (ICC) appointed Richie Richardson as the match referee for the fixtures, the first time the ICC has sent an official to oversee cricket matches in Pakistan since 2009. Aleem Dar, Ahsan Raza, Ahmed Shahab and Shozab Raza were appointed as the on-field umpires. The Pakistan Cricket Board (PCB) introduced the #CricketKiHalalala hashtag for the series.

The PCB spent an estimated $3 million to host the three matches, with players on the World XI team being paid approximately $100,000 each. The ICC contributed more than $1 million towards security costs. While attendance for the first two matches were as high as 90%, this was down on the crowd numbers for the final of the 2017 Pakistan Super League. Higher ticket pricing was to blame for the drop in attendance, with some tickets being given to local schools as a result. The ICC and PCB looked at the possibility for further World XI tours to Pakistan in the next two years, with the priority for more Full Member sides to tour.

Following the conclusion of the series, Faf du Plessis said how much it meant for the people of Pakistan and that it hopefully will bring cricket back to the country. Sarfraz Ahmed said that he was thankful to the World XI team and that "I expect these players to return back to Pakistan with full squads to play a full Test series". The ICC congratulated Pakistan for hosting the tournament, with the aim to get bilateral international cricket returning to Pakistan. The following month, the Sri Lanka cricket team played a T20I in Lahore against Pakistan.

Squads

T20I series

1st T20I

2nd T20I

3rd T20I

References

External links
 Series home at ESPN Cricinfo

2017 in Pakistani cricket
International cricket competitions in 2017
Multi-national cricket tours of Pakistan
September 2017 sports events in Pakistan